Balanophora cucphuongensis is a species of plant in the Balanophoraceae family. It is found in Cúc Phương National Park and Kon Tum Province, Vietnam. Local people use this plant as a medical treatment for erectile dysfunction and enhancement of libido.

References

cucphuongensis
Flora of Vietnam